St. Stanislaus High School is a private  primary and secondary school for boys located in  Bandra, Mumbai, Maharashtra, India. Founded in 1863 by German Jesuit priests as an orphanage, the institution later grew to be a full-fledged school for day-scholars as well as boarders and now has more than 2,300 students from KG-10.

Sports
In addition to academic work, the school encourages the development of young athletes and sportsmen. Teachers like Master Neeff, Master Oliver, Master Willy, Master Donald and sportsmasters include Oliver Andrade (who founded the famous Jogger's Park in Bandra Mumbai), Master Cyril Gabriel, Fr. Harry Pereira, S.J., Fr. Benjamin Fernandes, S.J., and Fr. Robin Selwyn, S.J., in the 1970s and 1980s saw the place of sports in the full development of youth.

Through the efforts of Fr. Lawrie Ferrao, as principal, the gymnasium was upgraded with a treadmill. The Donnelly field was completely redone with new turf and sprinklers. After that the carpentry room next to the Donnelly gym was renovated and part of it made into a changing room, and the toilet facilities repaired. The grounds facing Waroda Road were revamped and floors tiled, for weddings and other gatherings. It is also called "The Backyard Lawn".

The school has won inter-school tournaments, participating in the Ahmed Sailor Cup in field hockey. The school has a grass hockey ground (Donnelly Gym), two basketball courts, an outdoor badminton court, two football grounds, two smaller grounds, a swimming pool and a gymnasium. The hockey ground is used to play state-level tournaments.

School houses
The school has four houses: Britto (red), Loyola (yellow), Xavier (blue), and Kostka (green), named after Jesuit saints John de Britto, Ignatius Loyola, Francis Xavier, and Stanislaus Kostka.  New students are assigned to a house. Points are awarded for activities and competitions, and the winning house is announced each week.  House captains are elected each year.

Principals
The following individuals have served as principal of the school:

Notable alumni
The Stanislaus Ex-students Association was started by Fr. Joseph Casasayas SJ in 1936. It is a not-for-profit organization aimed at assisting alumni (ex-students and ex-staff members) to network.

 Arbaaz Khan, Bollywood actor

 Anthony de Mello, priest and author
 Cardinal Ivan Dias, cardinal of the Roman Catholic Church
 Dinesh D'Souza, conservative US commentator
 Faisal Farooqui, founder and CEO, MouthShut.com
 Lt. General Francis Dias, PVSM, AVSM, VrC (Retd.) Indian Army
 Marcellus Gomes, represented India at the Olympics
 Prakash Yashwant Ambedkar, politician

 
 Salman Khan, Bollywood actor
 Shaan, singer, actor and television presenter.
 Sohail Khan, Bollywood actor
 Flt. Lt. Lawrence Frederic Pereira, VrC. Indian Air Force
 Viren Rasquinha, former captain of India's national field hockey team

See also

 List of Jesuit schools
 List of schools in Maharashtra
 Violence against Christians in India

References

External links
St. Stanislaus High School Official website
St. Peter's Church: Roman Catholic church is situated just inside the entrance of the school.
St. Stanislaus Ex-students Association
 

Jesuit secondary schools in India
Jesuit primary schools in India
Catholic boarding schools in India
Boys' schools in India
Christian schools in Maharashtra
High schools and secondary schools in Mumbai
Bandra
Educational institutions established in 1863
1863 establishments in India